Ad Sinarum gentem, issued on October 7, 1954, is an encyclical of Pope Pius XII to the Chinese people on the super-nationality of the Church.

Background

The encyclical is written against the background of continued persecution of Christians in the People's Republic of China, the expulsion of foreign missionaries,  the jailing of domestic priests and lay people, and the attempts by the State to institute a national Chinese Catholic Church.  Three years earlier,  the Pope had issued the apostolic letter Cupimus Imprimis   to the Chinese people,  to express his "sympathy in your afflictions, but also to exhort you paternally to fulfil all the duties of the Christian religion with that resolute fidelity that sometimes demands heroic strength". "Since that time, the conditions of the Catholic Church have not improved. Accusations and calumnies against the Apostolic See, and those who keep themselves faithful to it, have increased. The Apostolic Nuncio has been expelled. Although the "great majority of Catholics have remained steadfast in the Faith, some adhered  to dangerous movements from  the enemies of all religion".

Message
The Pope warns against separation from Rome, defends the Church against accusations of undermining Chinese culture and society, and welcomes cultural differences in preaching and teaching.

This pastoral flexibility cannot imply however, that the Church agrees to political theology or a specific Chinese Christianity.

Notes

References

External links
 Ad Sinarum gentem, full text of Pius XII's encyclical, 7 October 1954, on the Vatican website.

Persecution of Catholics during the pontificate of Pope Pius XII
Catholic Church in China
Encyclicals of Pope Pius XII
October 1954 events
1954 in Christianity